DaeSean Kameron Hamilton (born March 10, 1995) is an American football wide receiver who is a free agent. He played college football at Penn State. He was drafted by the Denver Broncos in the 4th round of the 2018 NFL Draft.

High school career
Hamilton attended Mountain View High School in Stafford, Virginia, playing safety and wide receiver for Coach Lou Sorrentino. He earned numerous awards between football, basketball and academics. He was a four-year letterman, two-time team captain, and one of the top playmakers in Virginia. As a senior, he was named honorable mention for all-state and earned first-team all-district, all-area and all-region honors. Hamilton earned the title of Commonwealth District Offensive Player-of-the-Year by making 64 catches for 1,073 yards and 10 touchdowns as a senior. Also, as a junior he gained titles of honorable-mention all-state, first-team all-district, all-area and all-region. Hamilton was invited to play in the Chesapeake Bowl and the U.S. Army All-American game. He was ranked a four-star recruit by ESPN.com and a three-star prospect by Rivals.com, Scout.com and 247Sports.com. He was ranked among the top 20 recruits in the state of Virginia and was a top 60 wide receiver, according to all four recruiting services. Hamilton graduated with honors and earned an advanced diploma from Mountain View, while attaining Academic All-Conference during his career, as well. He also lettered three times in basketball.

College career
Hamilton finished his career as Penn State's all-time receptions leader with 214, making him the only player in school history with 200+ catches. His 2,842 career receiving yards puts him third all-time for the Nittany Lions.

Hamilton was a four-time academic All Big Ten honoree (2014-2017).

As a freshman (2014), Hamilton was selected to Big Ten All-Freshman Team by BTN.com, ESPN.com and 247Sports, Freshman All-American by College Football News (second-team) and Athlon Sports (third-team); second-team All-Big Ten by the media  and Phil Steele’s College Football, and honorable-mention All-Big Ten by coaches.

Hamilton was named honorable-mention All-Big Ten from the media following his sophomore year (2015).

Following his senior season (2017), Hamilton received All-Bowl Team honors from the Associated Press; and second-team All-Big Ten honors from the coaches, Associated Press, Phil Steele and Pro Football Focus. He was selected for the 2018 East-West Shrine Game, Reese's Senior Bowl and the NFL Scouting Combine.

Penn State records
183 career receptions
14 receptions in a single game

College statistics

Professional career 
Hamilton participated in the 2018 NFL Scouting Combine.

Denver Broncos
Hamilton was drafted by the Denver Broncos in the fourth round, 113th overall, of the 2018 NFL Draft. He made his NFL debut in Week 1 of the 2018 season against the Seattle Seahawks. In Week 3, he had three punt returns for 31 net yards in the 27–14 loss to the Baltimore Ravens. In Week 5, he recorded his first three professional receptions, which went for 31 total yards, in the 34–16 loss to the New York Jets. Overall, Hamilton finished the 2018 season with 30 receptions for 243 receiving yards and two receiving touchdowns.

Hamilton appeared in all 16 games, of which he started two, in the 2019 season. He recorded 28 receptions for 297 receiving yards and one receiving touchdown.

Hamilton had 23 catches for 293 yards and two touchdowns in 2020.

In the 2021 offseason, it was reported that Hamilton would be traded or released; however, on May 14, 2021, he suffered a torn ACL, and was waived with a non-football injury designation on May 18. He reverted to the reserve/non-football injury list the next day after clearing waivers. He was released on March 8, 2022.

Houston Texans
On March 28, 2022, Hamilton signed with the Houston Texans. On June 10, 2022, he was waived by the Texans.

Miami Dolphins
On December 14, 2022, Hamilton was signed to the Miami Dolphins practice squad. He was released on December 30.

NFL career statistics

Personal life
Hamilton was born in Okinawa, Japan to his parents Johnie and Madgeline Hamilton, both U.S. Marines. The family eventually moved back to the United States and settled in Quantico, Virginia, when Hamilton was in fourth grade. Growing up, Hamilton took a role in raising his brother, Darius, who has nonverbal autism as his mother had breast cancer and his father was serving in the Marine Corps. Hamilton taught Darius many important tasks like how to tie his shoes and brush his teeth. During eighth-grade, Hamilton used his elective period to help Darius in his special-needs class. Hamilton has a "DKH" tattoo on his arm, which are his brother's initials. He started playing football in recreational leagues including Pop Warner.

References

External links
Denver Broncos bio
Penn State Nittany Lions bio
ESPN bio

1995 births
Living people
People from Okinawa Island
Sportspeople from Fredericksburg, Virginia
American football wide receivers
Penn State Nittany Lions football players
Denver Broncos players
Players of American football from Virginia
Houston Texans players
Miami Dolphins players